Kirsi Johanna Ojansuu (born 15 December 1963) is a Finnish politician and member of the Finnish Parliament, representing the Green League. She was first elected to parliament in 1999. In 2021 she became a temporary priest in Helsinki.

Life 
Ojansuu was born in Kemijärvi, Finland. She has a master's degree in education from the University of Tampere.

She was first elected to parliament in 1999. Since 1993 she has also been a member of the city council of Hämeenlinna.

In 2008 sje decided to renew her aspirations to be a priest. She started to study theology at university in 2012.

In 2021 she was elected to be a temporary priest until 2023 for the parish of Malmi in Helsinki. An application was made for her to be ordained.

Private life 
She is married to Johannes Ojansuu and they have three children, Matvei (b. 1988), Aatos (b. 1991), and Simona (b. 1995).

References

External links
Official website

1963 births
Living people
People from Kemijärvi
Green League politicians
Members of the Parliament of Finland (1999–2003)
Members of the Parliament of Finland (2003–07)
Members of the Parliament of Finland (2007–11)
21st-century Finnish women politicians
Women members of the Parliament of Finland
University of Tampere alumni